Storyville is a 1992 film directed by Mark Frost and starring James Spader. The film takes its name from the historic Storyville red-light district of New Orleans.

Premise
Cray Fowler, a young lawyer running for congress from New Orleans, is filmed with a prostitute as blackmail. As he investigates, Fowler discovers some shocking secrets involving his father, his family's fortune and his own political advisors.

Cast
 James Spader as Cray Fowler
 Joanne Whalley-Kilmer as Natalie Tate
 Jason Robards as Clifford Fowler
 Charlotte Lewis as Lee Tran
 Michael Warren as Nathan LeFleur
 Piper Laurie as Constance Fowler
 Michael Parks as Michael Trevallian
 Chuck McCann as Pudge Herman
 Charles Haid as Abe Choate
 Chino Fats Williams as Theotis Washington
 Woody Strode as Charlie Sumpter
 Jeff Perry as Peter Dandridge
 Galyn Görg as Spice
 Justine Arlin as Melanie Fowler
 George Kee Cheung as Xang Tran
 Steve Forrest as Judge Quentin Murdoch

Critical reception
On Rotten Tomatoes the film has an approval rating of 67% based on 6 reviews.

Roger Ebert gave the film 3.5 out of 4 stars, writing, "Storyville is a movie for people who like New Orleans better when it is dark and mysterious. It is for romantics. It is not for pragmatists, who will complain that the characters do not behave according to perfect logic, and that there are holes in its plot. They will be right, of course – this is not an airtight movie – but they will have missed the point, and the fun."

James Spader's performance was praised by critics, including Vincent Canby of The New York Times who wrote, "Mr. Spader may have won prizes for Sex, Lies, and Videotape but he comes of age as an actor in Storyville. The performance is clean, uncluttered and often funny, without sidestepping the material."

Canby also praised the film's cinematography and Frost's directing, invoking Frost's collaboration with David Lynch on Twin Peaks, and calling the film "far less of a tease than the television series, a good deal shorter and much more fun."

References

External links
 
 

1992 films
1990s thriller drama films
American political thriller films
American courtroom films
Films shot in New Orleans
Films scored by Carter Burwell
Films set in New Orleans
Films directed by Mark Frost
Films with screenplays by Mark Frost
1992 drama films
1990s English-language films
1990s American films